The Erie St. Clair LHIN is one of fourteen Local Health Integration Networks (LHINs) in the Canadian province of Ontario.

The Erie St. Clair Local Health Integration Network is a community-based, non-profit organization funded by the Government of Ontario through the Ministry of Health and Long-Term Care.

Services
Erie St Clair LHIN plans, funds and coordinates the following operational public health care services to a population of approximately 643,000 people:

 Hospitals - Public General Hospital:
 Sydenham District Hospital (Wallaceburg, ON)
 Charlotte Eleanor Englehart Hospital (Petrolia, ON)
 Sarnia General Hospital (Sarnia, ON)
 Public General Hospital (Chatham, ON)
 Leamington District Memorial Hospital (Leamington, ON)
 Hôtel-Dieu Grace Healthcare (Windsor, ON)
 Windsor Regional Hospital (Windsor, ON)
 Long-Term Care Homes
 Community Care Access Centre (CCAC)
 Community Support Service Agencies
 Mental Health and Addiction Agencies
 Community Health Centres (CHCs)

Geographic area
Erie St. Clair LHIN services the following regions:

 Chatham-Kent
 Sarnia/Lambton
 Windsor/Essex

Budget
The Erie St. Clair LHIN has an annual budget of over $1.45 billion.

External links
 Eries St. Clair LHIN - official web site

References

Health regions of Ontario